Dominika Ostałowska (born 18 February 1971, Warsaw) is a Polish film, television and theatre actress. She is a two-time winner of Polish Film Awards for Best Actress for her performance in a 2000 film Keep Away from the Window and for Best Supporting Actress for her role in a 2003 film Warsaw.

Life and career
She was born on 21 February 1971 in Warsaw to father Ryszard Ostałowski and mother Irena. She graduated from the Adam Mickiewicz High School No. 4 in Warsaw. In 1994, she graduated from the National Academy of Dramatic Art in Warsaw.

Between 1994–2000, she worked at the Warsaw's Ateneum Theatre and between 2000–2012 at the Powszechny Theatre. Since 2012, she has been working at the Stanisław Ignacy Witkiewicz Studio Theatre.

Her most critically acclaimed roles come from Mariusz Treliński's 1995 film Łagodna based on a short story by Fyodor Dostoyevsky; Jerzy Stuhr's 1997 film Love Stories, Lech Majewski's 1999 biopic Wojaczek and Jan Jakub Kolski's 2000 war film Keep Away from the Window based on Hanna Krall's short story Ta z Hamburga (The One From Hamburg). She also achieved great popularity by playing the character of Marta in a TV soap opera M jak miłość. In 2009, she was a member of jury at the 34th Gdynia Film Festival. In 2012, she hosted the Tajemnice Rezydencji TV programme.

Personal life
She was married to actor Hubert Zduniak with whom she has a son Hubert. She was also married to film director Mariusz Malec. She is known for her involvement in social campaigns against stalking. In 2013, she became an ambassador of the campaign Stop Stalking.

Appearances in film and television
1994: Anioł śmierci as Sonia
1995: Łagodna as wife
1997: Bracia Witmanowie as Iren
1997: Ostatni rozdział as a maid
1997: Dusza śpiewa as Adam's wife
1997: Musisz żyć jako Agnieszka, as a daughter of the Hyńczak family
1997: Historie miłosne as Ewa Bielska
1997: Drugi brzeg as Henrietta Vogel
1997: Boża podszewka as Anusia Jurewicz
1998: Złoto dezerterów as a bank guard
1999: Wojaczek as Mała
1999: Rodzina zastępcza as a teacher (episode 14)
since 2000: M jak miłość as Marta Wojciechowska-Budzyńska
2000: Keep Away from the Window as Regina Lilienstern
2002: Miss mokrego podkoszulka as Magda
2003: Warszawa as Wiktoria
2006: Nadzieja as Franciszek's mother
2006: Norymberga as a journalist
2007: Regina as Regina
2007: Kryminalni as Magda Leszczyńska (episode 87)
2007: Ekipa as Karolina Jabłonowska (episodes 7 and 14)
2008: Rodzina zastępcza as herself (episode 286)
2009: Projekt dziecko, czyli ojciec potrzebny od zaraz as Anna Nowak
2009: Co mówią lekarze as Joanna Knap
2011: Głęboka woda as Wioletta, Karolina's mother (episode 2)
2013: Prawo Agaty as Barbara Król (episode 46)
2013: Hotel 52 as Nina Richter (episode 84)
2014: O mnie się nie martw as Elżbieta Kosowska (episode 2)
2015: Prokurator as Anna Falkowska (episode 6)
2015: Na dobre i na złe as  Weronika's mother (episodes 609, 610 and 612)
2015: Historia Roja as Countess Gąsowska (episode 5)
2016: Historia Roja as Countess Gąsowska
2017: Ojciec Mateusz as Urszula Jaskólska (episode 235)
2018–2019: Przyjaciółki as Olga Bratkowska
2019: Echo serca as Justyna Bogucka (episode 12)

See also
Polish cinema
Polish Film Awards

References

1971 births
Living people
Actresses from Warsaw
Polish television actresses
Aleksander Zelwerowicz National Academy of Dramatic Art in Warsaw alumni